Christos "Chris" Kalantzis (born 27 July 1967) is an Australian former soccer player who played at the highest level of domestic football in Greece and Australia. He played at international level for Australia.

Playing career

Club career
Born in Sydney to Greek immigrants. His father came from the village of Loukas in Arcadia region of the Peloponnese, Greece and his mother came from the village of Managouli in Aetolia-Acarnania, Greece, he began his career with Sydney Olympic, First Grade, at the age of 15. He was then signed by the Greek team Panathinaikos, where he played for five years. Olympiacos, a rival Greek club, then signed him. On his debut against his former team he scored with his famous bicycle kick from outside the box.

He played for Olympiacos another five years before returning to Sydney Olympic to finish his career, playing two years before retiring.

International career
Kalantzis played seven matches in full international matches for Australia.

Post-football career
In February 2011, Olympiacos announced the establishment of its first Olympiacos Academy outside of Greece in Sydney, Australia. The Australian academy is managed by Kalantzis and Kyriakos Tohouroglou, both former Olympiacos players.

Honours
National Soccer League Cup Winners: 1983, 1985
A' Ethniki: 1989–90, 1990–91, 1996–97
Greek Cup: 1988, 1989, 1991, 1993

References

External links

 Chris Kalantzis Interview
 One-on-one with Chris Kalantzis

1967 births
Living people
Australian soccer players
Australian people of Greek descent
Australian expatriate soccer players
Australia international soccer players
Australia B international soccer players
Super League Greece players
Olympiacos F.C. players
Panathinaikos F.C. players
Sydney Olympic FC players
National Soccer League (Australia) players
Association football midfielders
Naturalized citizens of Greece
Soccer players from Sydney